Gstadt am Chiemsee is a municipality in the district of Rosenheim, Bavaria, Germany. It is located on lake Chiemsee.

Municipal parts
Gstadt am Chiemsee consists of the municipal parts of 
 Gollenshausen
 Gstadt
 Aich
 Aiglsbuch
 Aisching
 Ed
 Lienzing
 Lienzinger Moos
 Loiberting
 Mitterndorf
 Plötzing
 Preinersdorf
 Schalchen
 Söll
 Weingarten

History
Gstadt am Chiemsee formerly belonged the monastery of Frauenchiemsee. After the administrative reform of Bavaria in 1818 it became a municipality. 
The earliest evidence of settlements, such as commodities or remains of lake dwellings, point to the Stone and Bronze Age from 5000 - 500 BC. The findings can be viewed in Bedaium Museum in Seebruck and Museum in Traunstein. In the Middle Ages, Bavarians from the Elbe river area settled in the region. Gstadt is located on the north side of lake Chiemsee, the largest lake in Bavaria (84 km2), and is also called "Bayerische Meer" (Bavarian Sea). Gstadt (original name "Gestadte") located in the "Chiemgau" region (a former Roman province of Noricum) was first documented in 1168 and was the departure point for boats crossing to the monastery of Frauenchiemsee. Later in the 19th century, the town was frequently visited by poets, writers and painters arriving on stagecoaches from Munich on their way to the islands. Through the centuries Gstadt remained loyal to agriculture and started to cater to tourism after World War II.

References

Rosenheim (district)